This is a list of parodies and pastiches satirising The Adventures of Tintin, the comics series by Belgian cartoonist Hergé.

In addition to the twenty-four official comic albums written by Hergé, several unofficial parodies and pastiches of The Adventures of Tintin have been published over the years by various authors. While some consist in entirely new drawings made to resemble the original art, others were created by splicing together strips from the original albums, and rewriting the dialogue.

The copyright owner of the original comics, Moulinsart, has taken legal steps to stop publication of some of the unofficial material.  Eric Jenot's Tintin Parodies site was closed down by Moulinsart in 2004 for displaying Tintin parodies and pastiches. Other material has remained available, for instance the anarchist/communist comic Breaking Free.

Parodies and satire

Some parodies of Tintin feature the actual Tintin characters with their original identities and personalities, some feature the original characters but with wildly modified personalities, and some simply reuse the appearance of the characters but give them completely different names and identities.

They generally fall into one of two sub-sections:

Political 

 Tintin au pays de nazis ("Tintin in the Land of the Nazis"), the short and crudely drawn strip lampoons Hergé for working for a Nazi-run newspaper during the occupation. Published in September 1944. 
 Breaking Free by J. Daniels — Anarchist/Communist book about Tintin growing up in a poor working class area of England and about how he joins the revolution.
 Tintin in Lebanon — Tintin gets drawn into Middle eastern conflicts while in Lebanon. This comic was published in National Lampoon, an American humour magazine, mocking the foreign policies of the Ronald Reagan administration.

 Tintin en Irak (Tintin in Iraq) — published shortly after the 2003 invasion of Iraq, this comic uses actual panels from previous Tintin comics—with new text—to make a cynical statement about the events leading up to the war.
 Tintin au Salvador (Tintin in El Salvador) — Tintin battles the corrupt government of El Salvador.
 L'Énigme du 3ième message (The Enigma of the 3rd Message) — Tintin battles an international evil conspiracy involving the Pope.
 Tintin dans le Golfe (Tintin in the Gulf)
 Juquin rénovateur du vingtième siècle au Pays de Soviets — This is a re-hash of Tintin in the Land of the Soviets with French political leader Pierre Juquin being drawn instead of Tintin. It was published in the book Élysez-les tous by Jalons.
 Tintin in Fallujah — featured in MAD magazine
 Les Harpes de Greenmore (The Harps of Greenmore) — Tintin is a Provisional IRA guerrilla fighting to re-unite Ireland, after the British government kidnaps Calculus in an attempt to blame the IRA.
 Former Australian Prime Minister Kevin Rudd, then opposition leader, was portrayed as Tintin for at least 6 months in 2007 by political cartoonist Bill Leak. Moulinsart threatened legal action and demanded payment for past sales of the Rudd-Tintin likeness.  Leak refused to give undertakings to cease using the character in future cartoons on the basis of the fair dealing exception for the purposes of parody and satire. Moulinsart conceded this point but continued to insist that Leak not profit commercially from publication of the cartoons.

Pornographic 

 Tintin in Thailand — Tintin goes to Thailand on a sex holiday.
 La vie sexuelle de Tintin (The Sex Life of Tintin)
 Tintin en Suisse (Tintin in Switzerland)
 Tintin à Paris (Tintin in Paris)
 Tientein en Bordélie (Tintin in Brotheland)
 Dindin et le secret de Moulinsal
 Tintin pour les dames (Tintin for Ladies)

Pastiches 
 Yves Rodier:
 Tintin and Alph-Art — A "completed" version of Hergé's unfinished book. Available in colour and in French and English.
 The Lake of the Sorcerer — Tintin uncovers the mystery of a monster in a lake.
 A Day at the Airport — Rodier planned to complete the album debuted by Hergé as soon as his own version of the Alph-Art was completed. However, due to harsh reactions from the Moulinsart Foundation, Rodier decided to leave the project, though he did produce one page from the Airport album.
 Reporter Pigiste (Freelance Reporter) — Three-page story, made in autumn 1992, loosely based on a scenario suggested in issue No. 1027 of Spirou from December 19, 1957: a young Tintin solves a bank robbery and gets his job with Le Petit Vingtiéme. The end of the story directly leads into Tintin in the Land of the Soviets.
  Tintin and the Thermozéro — This page is an inking of page 4 from a leftover project of Hergé's.
 Tintin et l'Alph-art (Tintin and Alph-art) by "Ramo Nash" (pseudonym) — This is a "completed" version of Hergé's unfinished Tintin and Alph-art. It is only available in black-and-white, and in French.
 Tintin in the New World by Frederic Tuten — A prose novel, not illustrated, that got Hergé's permission shortly before his death. Tintin gets bored of adventures and falls in love.
 Tintin and the Flute of the Wendigo and Tintin in Australia by Conlan.
 La Menace des Steppes (The Terror of the Steppes) by Sakharine (pseudonym) — Tintin and Haddock battle Soviets in Afghanistan.
 Teen Titans Spotlight #11, DC Comics, 1987, "The Brotherhood is Dead", written by Jean-Marc Lofficier, art by Joe Orlando
 Tum Tum and the Forged Expenses — At the height of its popularity in 1988, the Spitting Image television show produced a tie-in comic book featuring a Tintin spoof where Tum Tum, an alcoholic Fleet Street journalist, follows a false lead to a drugs-smuggling operation at a Soho S&M bar. Captain Haddock is portrayed as 'Captain Haddit', a leather-clad predatory homosexual. The Thomppson Twins (note the double p) turn up at the end of the story to arrest Tum Tum for his forged expenses claims. Snowy is renamed 'Spewy', and ends up being run over by a car. The story makes numerous references to real Tintin adventures (most notably The Blue Lotus) as well as fictional non-canonical ones (such as Tum Tum and the Cross-Eyed Vivisectionist).
 Objectif Monde (Destination World) by Didier Savard — Released in Le Monde on January 28, 1999, to celebrate Tintin's 70th birthday and the Comics Festival in Angoulême. The Hergé Foundation gave its authorization and allowed the publication of this first "official" pastiche, fully approved by Hergé's beneficiaries. The short story, 26 pages long, makes numerous references to the adventures of Tintin. The main protagonist is a naive young reporter called Wzkxy, who is embroiled in an unlikely conspiracy theory — supposedly the Tintin books contained encoded messages aimed at the USSR. It has since been reprinted in various forms, and has also been translated into English by Vlipvlop (pseudonym) in early 2006. The hero, Wzkxy, is a young reporter working in Le Monde.  He looks so much like Tintin that everyone prefers to call him "Tintin" rather than "Wzkxy", a completely unpronounceable name.  He identifies so much with Tintin that he imagines being accompanied by Snowy.  This pseudo-Tintin thus investigates the existence of an unpublished story by Hergé whose origin dates back to Tintin in the land of the Soviets.  The stories of Hergé were in fact coded messages sent to the Soviet bloc by the USA. Many characters from the adventures of Tintin appear: la Castafiore is the editor-in-chief of Le Monde, the Thompsons were faithful to their role of policemen, Calculus, etc.
 "Tim-Tim: Prisoners of the Red Planet", by Robert Sikoryak — A two-page parody of Destination Moon, about "Tim-Tim" on Mars, published in Wired magazine in July 2001.
 Tintin, Snowy, and Haddock all briefly appear in the comic Scarlet Traces, by Ian Edginton and D'Israeli.
 In Kim Newman's novel Dracula Cha-Cha-Cha, Tintin and Bianca Castafiore both appear, in chapters 8 and 11 respectively. In his short story "Angels of Music", Bianca Castafiore is implied to be the descendant of the character Carlotta from The Phantom of the Opera.
 Jan Bucquoy made a pornographic parodic comic book album named La Vie Sexuelle de Tintin (The Sexual Life of Tintin). The story is set during The Castafiore Emerald, and features most of Tintin's main cast along with many returning characters engaging in sexual activities, such as Tintin and Castafiore, Haddock and Calculus, and Nestor and Irma. Many scenes depict sexual acts perceived to be unethical, with instances of bestiality (such as Snowy performing fellatio on Tintin), and series villain Rastapopoulos is shown to engage in pedophilic acts. The story also takes liberties with series canon, such as revealing Thomson to be a woman wearing a disguise. In the comics conclusion, it is revealed that the events of the story were an elaborate porn film directed by original character "Bastapoglandos", who closely resembles Rastapopoulos.
 In the film Camping Cosmos a lookalike of Tintin is one of the main characters. Despite having a different name, his quiff, outfit and little white fox terrier are obviously referencing Tintin.
 Les Aventures de Lanceveal Dectective (The Adventures of Dectective Lanceveal- Le Jumeau Maléfique (means "The Evil Twin") by Exem: It takes place after Tintin and presumably Snowy are murdered by their evil twin Zinzin and Mildou leaving a Detective named Lanceveal and his dog Èrge to follow in Tintin's steps as he tries to get answers at Marlinspike only to see Captain Haddock hanging dead bt his penis and seeing Professor Caculus's decapitated head in a drawer.
Meanwhile, Zinzin and Mildew announces their evil deeds to the public with Flupke passing newspapers about it later Lanceveal thinks about Mr. and Mrs. George only to find out that they been stabbed to death by Zinzin and Mildew. Lanceveal sees Zinzin's next plan is in Paris to blow up the Panthéon in which Lanceveal fails to stop. At the end of the story Zinzin and Mildew gets into their red plane. Lanceveal tries stop them only for him to hurt his hand and only for them to get away.
 The next story called Zinzin, Maître du monde  ("Zinzin: Master of the World") takes place after Zinzin got away, Lanceveal is on a train when a woman asks him something. Soon as he gets out of it, he goes to a town meeting where they discussing what Zinzin did so far a character who resembles Tintin completely. Soon as Lanceveal leaves out, Tom (from Tintin in the Congo; This character is deceased in "The Adventures of Tintin") and a fakir (from Cigars of the Pharaoh) spots him and attempts to shoot Lanceveal but Quick (from Quick & Flupke) gets in the way only for the fakir and Tom to smash into Quick slaying him. Lanceveal ties up Tom & the fakir to leave the police to arrest them. As Lanceveal questions them, Tom tells him about Zinzin's latest plan and his criminal empire with many of Tintin's living enemies (Although Rastapopoulos who is Tintin's archenemy, is not involved in this criminal empire; nor he appears in this story.). He goes to see Dubo, Dubon and Dubbonet (The two of the characters resemble Thomson and Thompson) for help with Jo Zette and Jocko (from The Adventures of Jo, Zette and Jocko). Meanwhile, as Zinzin is having sex with an African lady, he gets interrupted by Allan Thompson who lets him know about his deal with a professor named Mabitenba. Zinzin gets dressed and leaves, As it transition back to Lanceveal, Dubo tells Lanceveal what Zinzin which is realved to be an organ taken from Tintin's corpse called ligne claire. Later it cuts back to Zinzin again. As Zinzin asks the doctors what's he getting he finds it's ligne claire which surprises him. It focuses on Lanveveal again where Jocko spots an island with a volcano. Lanceveal gets on a lifeboat and sails there to find Zinzin's hideout. Meanwhile, Professor Mabitenba invents robots penises for Zinzin who is plotting to take over the world only for Jocko who swam to chase a female chimp, accidentally made the robots active. The robots start having sex with each and one chases Zinzin with Lanceveal laughing only for him to get raped by one. Zinzin gets away by a submarine, Lanceveal notices a door and it contains multiple characters from many from series (especially The Adventures of Tintin) as the volcano erupts. Lanceveal and Jocko get away from it quickly as he gets on the boat. Zinzin is seen laughing at the end.
Exem would later go on to create more Detective Lanceveal stories 
 Australian artist Glenn Smith has created two mock covers for Tintin in Penrith and Tintin in The Shire, showing Tintin as a stereotypical bogan in these two Sydney districts.

Other
English filmmakers Nick Donnelly and Andrew Stebulitis created a YouTube series in 2006, Teesside Tintin, which would become a viral hit in the site's early days. By 2015, the videos had collectively accumulated 25 millions views. It involved re-editing the Nelvana animated series with new audio tracks, laced with profanity and references to Middlesbrough, England, where the pair came from. It would spawn a website, Dubtoons, which would host other redubs of children's cartoons.

References

External links 
 Tintin in Irak
 Tintin est Vivant! — (French)
 

Parodies
Tintin
Tintin parodies and pastiches